John Edwin Bertrand AO (born 20 December 1946) is a yachtsman from Australia, who skippered Australia II to victory in the 1983 America's Cup, ending 132 years of American supremacy, and the only time Australia has won. Bertrand won the bronze medal in the Finn competition at the 1976 Summer Olympics in Montreal. In 2010 and 2016, he won the world Etchells class sailing championships. He is a life member of both the Royal Brighton Yacht Club in Melbourne, and the Sorrento Sailing Couta Boat Club.

Biography 
John Bertrand was born in Melbourne, Victoria.

He wrote Born to Win, The Power of a Vision, about the 1983 America's Cup victory, including insightful observations on the strategy for an unfavoured team against very long odds. During the 1983 competition, Bertrand and his crew deliberately employed their own psychological strategy ahead of the America's Cup breakthrough in refusing to refer to the all-conquering American team by their names and instead calling their opposition simply "the red boat" in order to mislead the rival. In the 2016 Rio Olympics, Mack Horton, an Australian freestyle swimming champion, admitted the criticism towards another swimmer Sun Yang was a deliberate strategy to try and gain a mental edge on his rival, borrowing from the tactics employed by Bertrand in the lead-up to Australia II's famous triumph in 1983.

Bertrand is the chairman of the Sport Australia Hall of Fame (2005+) and The Alannah and Madeline Foundation (2001+).

He is also the President of Swimming Australia (Oct 2013+).

Honours
 26 January 1984: Member of the Order of Australia (AM) in recognition of service to yachting, particularly as skipper of the Australia II in the America's Cup challenge 1983.
 10 December 1985: Induction into the Sport Australia Hall of Fame
 18 September 1993:  Member of the America's Cup Hall of Fame for outstanding achievement in the America's Cup.
 14 July 2000: Australian Sports Medal for outstanding achievement in the America's Cup and general contribution
 1 January 2001: Centenary Medal for service to Australian society through the sport of Sailing.
 2008 Melburnian of the Year for community leadership.
 25 October 2013: Awarded an Honorary Doctorate, Victoria University.
 10 October 2014: Elevated to Legend of The Sport Australia Hall of Fame.
 2014: Bertrand was made a Monash University Vice Chancellor Professorial Fellow.
 2016: Upgraded to Officer of the Order of Australia (AO), the 2016 Queen's Birthday Honours list. In recognition for sporting administration, in particular swimming and sailing, children's welfare, higher education and mentoring of young people.

Personal
 Bertrand has a Bachelor of Engineering (Monash University 1970) and a Master of Science (Massachusetts Institute of Technology 1972).
 He has been married, since 1969, to Rasa Bertrand, whom he met as a student.

Notes

References
 
Sydney : Bantam Books, circa 1985. 
 
 [https://herreshoff.org/inductees/john-bertrand/ America's Cup Hall of Fame biography]

External links
 
 
 
 
 
 Untold: The Race of the Century at Netflix

1946 births
Living people
Etchells class world champions
World champions in sailing for Australia
1970 America's Cup sailors
1974 America's Cup sailors
1977 America's Cup sailors
1980 America's Cup sailors
1983 America's Cup sailors
1995 America's Cup sailors
Australian Champions Soling
Australian male sailors (sport)
Medalists at the 1976 Summer Olympics
Members of the Order of Australia
Monash University alumni
Olympic bronze medalists for Australia
Olympic medalists in sailing
Olympic sailors of Australia
Sailors at the 1972 Summer Olympics – Finn
Sailors at the 1976 Summer Olympics – Finn
Sport Australia Hall of Fame inductees
Sportspeople from Melbourne